Granite Falls is a city located mostly in Yellow Medicine County, Minnesota, of which it is the county seat with a small portion in Chippewa County, Minnesota. The population was 2,737 at the 2020 census. The Andrew John Volstead House, a National Historic Landmark, is located in Granite Falls.

History
Granite Falls was platted in 1872. The city was named for deposits of granite rock in the area. A post office has been in operation at Granite Falls since 1870. Granite Falls was incorporated as a city in 1879 with East Granite Falls joining in 1889.

2000 tornado
On July 25, 2000, the city of Granite Falls and Yellow Medicine County were hit by a powerful tornado. The tornado first touched down in rural parts of the county west-northwest of Granite Falls, hitting the city at 6:10 pm. After tearing through the residential sections of town, the tornado lifted at approximately 6:25PM after being on the ground for over nine miles. One person was killed, more than a dozen were injured, and the town and surrounding area suffered millions of dollars in property damage. Most of the damage in Granite Falls was rated F2 and F3, but the extent of the damage at the corner of 9th Avenue and 14th Street caused the National Weather Service to classify it as an F4 tornado.

Geography

U.S. Highway 212 and Minnesota State Highways 23 and 67 are three of the main routes in the city.

Climate
Granite Falls, along with the rest of Minnesota, has a humid continental climate with significant differences between seasons. With a July mean temperature of  Granite Falls just falls into the hot-summer zone of the Köppen classification of the humid continental climate regime. Winters are cold and dry influenced by arctic air masses affecting it through its continental position, while summers are influenced by humid subtropical air masses bringing hot temperatures and significant rainfall. The middle three months in each of those cycles are also clearly warmer and colder, respectively, than the months at the beginning or at the end of transitional periods. That is in turn a typical feature of continental climates.

Demographics

2010 census
As of the census of 2010, there were 2,897 people in 1,282 households, including 747 families, in the city. The racial makup of the city was 89.9% White, 0.6% African American, 5.2% Native American, 0.4% Asian, 1.8% from other races, and 2.1% from two or more races. Hispanic or Latino of any race were 4.7%.

Of the 1,282 households 25.7% had children under the age of 18 living with them, 44.1% were married couples living together, 10.1% had a female householder with no husband present, 4.1% had a male householder with no wife present, and 41.7% were non-families. 37.2% of households were one person and 17.2% were one person aged 65 or older. The average household size was 2.17 and the average family size was 2.82.

The median age was 43 years. 21.5% of residents were under the age of 18; 8.8% were between the ages of 18 and 24; 22.3% were from 25 to 44; 26.9% were from 45 to 64; and 20.7% were 65 or older. The gender makeup of the city was 48.4% male and 51.6% female.

2000 census
As of the census of 2000, there were 3,070 people in 1,344 households, including 806 families, in the city. The racial makup of the city was 92.35% White, 0.07% African American, 5.70% Native American, 0.16% Asian, 0.42% from other races, and 1.30% from two or more races. Hispanic or Latino of any race were 2.15%.

Of the 1,344 households 27.7% had children under the age of 18 living with them, 50.5% were married couples living together, 7.7% had a female householder with no husband present, and 40.0% were non-families. 35.0% of households were one person and 18.5% were one person aged 65 or older. The average household size was 2.24 and the average family size was 2.91.

The age distribution was 24.1% under the age of 18, 7.9% from 18 to 24, 24.1% from 25 to 44, 22.0% from 45 to 64, and 21.8% 65 or older. The median age was 41 years. For every 100 females, there were 86.1 males. For every 100 females age 18 and over, there were 81.2 males.

The median household income was $32,031 and the median family income was $45,536. Males had a median income of $32,905 versus $22,957 for females. The per capita income for the city was $18,356. About 6.6% of families and 9.7% of the population were below the poverty line, including 6.8% of those under age 18 and 10.6% of those age 65 or over.

Politics

Media

Television

Infrastructure

Transportation
  United States Highway 212
  Minnesota State Highway 23
  Minnesota State Highway 67

References

External links

City Website
Advocate-Tribune newspaper site

Cities in Chippewa County, Minnesota
Cities in Renville County, Minnesota
Cities in Yellow Medicine County, Minnesota
Cities in Minnesota
County seats in Minnesota